The Royal Naval Hospital, Stonehouse was a medical facility for naval officers and other ranks at Stonehouse, Plymouth.

History

The naval hospital was built between 1758 and 1765 to a design by the little-known Alexander Rovehead. The design was influential in its time: its pattern of detached wards (arranged so as to maximise ventilation and minimise spread of infection) foreshadows the 'pavilion' style of hospital building which was popularised by Florence Nightingale a century later. The site for the hospital was formerly known as the mill fields (after the nearby tide mills on Stonehouse Creek). Towards the end of the century, Stoke Military Hospital was built by the Army, facing the naval hospital directly across the creek.

The hospital closed in 1995; it is now a gated residential complex called The Millfields. The site contains over 20 listed buildings and structures.

Description

The hospital housed 1,200 patients in sixty wards, its ten ward blocks being arranged around a courtyard with a central block containing the chapel, dispensary and staff housing.  Patients were landed directly from Stonehouse Creek (now playing fields) where the remains of a jetty can still be seen, flanked by stone steps which formerly descended into the creek; from here an entrance arch led to receiving wards (with a bath room and a clothing store) where new arrivals were washed and provided with clean bedclothes. Until the mid-1790s there was no separate operating theatre in the hospitals; surgery was performed in the wards (much to the 'offence' of other patients, according to contemporary reports). Later, an operating room was set up in one of the four single-story blocks which interspersed the ward blocks on the north and south side of the quadrangle (these fulfilled various roles over the course of the hospital's history, including serving at times, variously, as a cookhouse, a victualling room, a smallpox ward and a lunatic ward).

West of the main quadrangle, facing the central block with its cupola, Rovehead built a pedimented terrace of houses, providing accommodation for senior officials (the surgeon, the physician, the steward and the agent), beyond which were stables and houses for two clerks. Later, following the appointment of a Governor to the hospital in 1795, a pair of larger houses were built, facing each other either side of the terrace so as to create a smaller quadrangle; Directly opposite the water gate (with its jetty) was the main entrance from the street, which was flanked by a pair of lodges which provided accommodation for officers of the Royal Marine detachment which provided a guard for the Hospital; the Marines themselves were accommodated in a small barracks just outside the gate, similar in design to the nearby (and near-contemporary) Stonehouse Royal Marine Barracks. Later, police took over guard duty, and the barracks became a police station. A water tower on the edge of the site provided a pressured supply to the wards and to water closets around the site: an early example of a pressurised water sanitation system.

In 1826 a burial ground was established on a parcel of land to the north-east of the hospital site, and a gate was opened in the boundary wall (by the water tower) to provide access; later a mortuary chapel was built, just inside the gate. A new hospital chapel was provided in 1883 with the dedication Church of the Good Shepherd, placed east of the main quadrangle on the main east-west axis. At around the same time, the wash house on the northern edge of the site was expanded to serve as a laundry, with the addition of a sizeable boiler house alongside. A significant expansion of facilities within the site took place from 1898-1906, with the addition of a sick officers' quarters beyond the chapel, staff quarters alongside it, a row of four zymotic ward blocks just north-east of the main quadrangle and a new dispensary (along with a house for the chief pharmacist)
near the water gate. All these were built using distinctive yellow brick, which contrasts with the Plymouth limestone of the earlier buildings on the site.

References

Defunct hospitals in England
Hospitals in Devon
Military hospitals in the United Kingdom
Royal Navy Medical Service